The 2020–21 Panathinaikos season was the club's 62nd consecutive season in Super League Greece. They also competed in the Greek Cup, falling in the quarter-final stage to PAS Giannina.

Players

Transfers

Summer window

In

Loan returns

Out

Loans out

Winter window

In

Loans in

Out

Loans out

Pre-season and friendlies

Competitions

Super League Greece

Regular season

League table

Matches

Play-off round

Greek Football Cup

Quarter-finals

References

External links
 Panathinaikos FC official website

Panathinaikos
Panathinaikos F.C. seasons